Hnutí Brontosaurus (-Czech, translated to English as The Brontosaurus Movement) is a large nature conservation group in the Czech Republic concentrated on the youth. Brontosaurus was founded in 1974, being the first such an organization in Czechoslovakia. It was named after Brontosaurus, name which was at the time widely used as a synonym for dinosaur among the Czechs. The chosen name was to remind the fate of dinosaurs, which died out during the Cretaceous–Paleogene extinction event.

The founders were several young enthusiasts from the Institute of Landscape Ecology of Czechoslovak Academy of Sciences. Their preparations had started in 1972. The plan was covered in a popular journal for the youth, Mladý Svět, whose illustrator Vladimír Jiránek sketched the logo. In January 1974 "Akce Brontosaurus" (Action Brontosaurus) started as a batch of ten tasks concentrated on environment education and to be finished within one year. Unexpected success led to an indefinite extension of the programme and appearance of regional branches. Since 1978 Mladý Svět adopted it under name "Holidays with Brontosaurus" (Prázdniny s Brontosaurem), massively adding to its popularity. In the same year Brontosaurus had to become a collective member of Socialist Union of Youth, a pro-regime political organization aiming to completely cater the youth population. Brontosaurus had organized numerous festivals, propagation tours and competitions and has managed to increase awareness about the numerous ecological problems.

After the fall of communist party from power in 1989 Brontosaurus became independent organization and restructured internally. The organization decided to concentrate on free time activities and education and avoid involvement in politics so popular among the other environmental groups in the Czech Republic. In 1992 a group of members left and set up independent "Asociace Brontosaura" (Association Brontosaurus). In 1996 a conflict between two groups within Brontosaurus almost broke it down; discovery of embezzlement further worsened the situation. The conflict got largely resolved during Autumn 1999 - 2000 but the organization was financially ruined (another embezzlement by a former leader was discovered). The government stepped in providing over 80% of its budget in 2001.

As of 2007 Hnutí Brontosaurus has around 1,000 members structured into 30 local groups. Concentrating on children and the youth, they organize weekend trips, summer camps, illustrated humour competition "Ekofór", education tour and courses and also ecological consultations. Budget in 2005 was around 1.6 million of CZK. About two thirds of the income came as grants by the government and municipalities, about one third was profit from business activities.

External links
 Hnutí Brontosaurus website (in Czech)
 Study with the history of Brontosaurus until 2001 (RTF, in Czech)

Brontosaurus